Red Creek may refer to:

 Red Creek, New York, a village
 Red Creek (New York), a tributary of Cayuga Lake in Seneca County
 Red Creek (Susquehanna River tributary), a creek in Otsego County, New York
 A tributary of the Dry Fork (Cheat River) in West Virginia
Red Creek, West Virginia, an unincorporated community named for it
 Red Creek (Mississippi), a tributary of the Pascagoula River
 Red Creek (Paragonah), a stream in Iron County, Utah